Elsa Watson is an American author.  Her first novel, Maid Marian (2005), details a history of Marian, the female companion to Robin Hood.

Watson was inspired to write about Marian because "It struck [her] as strange that [Marian's] name is so well known, yet no one has a sense of her character beyond her role as Robin Hood's consort." 

Watson is also the author of Dog Days, published in May 2012, A Christmas Tail (October 2012), and The Love Dog (January 2013).

Elsa Watson graduated from Carleton College with a degree in classical languages and now lives on Bainbridge Island.

References

External links
Watson's official site
Elsa Watson at The Crown Publishing Group's site

Living people
Year of birth missing (living people)
American women novelists
21st-century American women